Yashodhara Raje Scindia (born 19 June 1954) is an Indian politician and Minister of Sports and Youth Welfare, Technical Education and Skill Development and Employment of Madhya Pradesh. She is also the former Minister for Commerce, Industries and Employment in Government of Madhya Pradesh. She is the youngest daughter of Jivajirao Scindia, Maratha Maharaja of Gwalior and the Late Rajmata Vijayaraje Scindia of Gwalior. She was first elected from Gwalior (Lok Sabha constituency) to the 14th Lok Sabha via a by-poll in 2007 and again in 2009 General Election. She is a Member of Legislative Assembly from Shivpuri constituency in Madhya Pradesh since 2013.

She was educated at The Cathedral and John Connon School in Mumbai, then the Presentation Convent, Kodaikanal, and her final 2 years at the Scindia Kanya Vidyalaya, Gwalior, a school founded by her mother.

Personal life and family
Her siblings are Vasundhra Raje Scindia former Chief Minister of Rajasthan, late Madhavrao Scindia, Padmavati Raje 'Akkasaheb' Burman and Usharaje Rana. Usha Raje Rana married Pashupati Shamsher Jang Bahadur Rana, grandson of His Highness Shree Shree Shree Maharaja Sir Mohan Shamsher Jang Bahadur Rana of Nepal. Pashupati Shamsher Jang Bahadur Rana is the now erstwhile Maharaja of Nepal.

Her brother was Madhavrao Scindia who was born in 1945. He was an eminent politician belonging to the Indian National Congress party as opposed to his mother and sisters who belong to the Bhartiya Janata Party. He was married to Madhavi Raje Scindia of Nepal and had two children Chitrangada Raje Scindia who married into the erstwhile royal family of Kashmir and Jyotiraditya Madhavrao Scindia the former Member of Parliament from the Congress Party of the Guna constituency in Madhya Pradesh. Madhav Rao died in a plane crash in 2001. Her other sister is Vasundhara Raje Scindia of Dholpur who is a member of the Bhartiya Janata Party. Vasundhara has one son Dushyant Singh the Yuvraj of Dholpur who is currently the Member of Parliament from the Jhalawar in Rajasthan.

Yashodhara moved to New Orleans, USA in 1977 after marrying Sidharth Bhansali a cardiologist. She has 3 children, Akshay a producer at MTV Desi in New York (26 yrs), Abhishek a student at the NYU Stern School of business (born in 1985) and Trishala a student at NYU (born in 1988). Whilst there, she was amongst other things, board member of the Delta Festival Ballet, an Advisory Board Member of the Contemporary Art Center, a Fellow of the New Orleans Museum of Art as well as single-handedly raised a quarter of a million dollars for the Audubon zoological society. The funds were dedicated to a permanent Indian exhibit space at the Audubon zoo (Voted the # 3 zoo in the whole of USA). After raising the funds she conceptualized and supervised the making of the entire exhibit which was made by local craftsmen in India and then transported in small pieces by sea and re-assembled at the site.

She finalized her divorce and entered politics after returning to India in 1994.

Political life and career
She returned to India in 1994 and went into formal politics, contesting the Madhya Pradesh State Assembly Elections in 1998 as a member of the Bhartiya Janata Party and then being re-elected 5 years later once again, for a second term in 2003 in the State Assembly elections. She is an active member of her State Legislative Party. She served in Madhya Pradesh Government as a Cabinet Minister for Tourism, Sports & Youth Welfare. In October/November 2006 Yashodhara created a controversy of sorts when she got the BJP to issue a notice saying that she would be officially addressed as "Shrimant" which means your highness or your majesty.

In by-elections to be held in early March 2007, she has been nominated as the party's candidate from Gwalior, Madhya Pradesh. On Sunday 11 March 2007 Yashodhara Raje Scindia of the BJP was declared elected to the Gwalior Lok Sabha seat. She defeated her nearest Congress rival Ashok Singh by over 35,000 votes.

On 8 December 2013 she won Legislative Assembly elections in Shivpuri with 76,330 votes.

Again, she won from Shivpuri Assembly constituency in 2018 with 24,282.

Ancestry

See also 
 Shivraj Singh Chouhan Third ministry (2013–)

References

External links
 Yashodhara Raje Scindia Rediff - 28 February 1998
 Rediff - "The People's Princess" 17 November 2003
 Yashodhara wins Gwalior bypoll hands down 12 March 2007
 Jyotiraditya Schindia

Yashodhara
Bharatiya Janata Party politicians from Madhya Pradesh
1954 births
Living people
India MPs 2004–2009
British emigrants to India
India MPs 2009–2014
Madhya Pradesh MLAs 1998–2003
Madhya Pradesh MLAs 2003–2008
Lok Sabha members from Madhya Pradesh
Madhya Pradesh MLAs 2013–2018
State cabinet ministers of Madhya Pradesh
Indian female royalty
People from Gwalior
21st-century Indian women politicians
21st-century Indian politicians
Madhya Pradesh MLAs 2018–2023
Women members of the Madhya Pradesh Legislative Assembly